Fearless, also known as Huo Yuanjia in Chinese, and as Jet Li's Fearless in the United Kingdom and in the United States, is a 2006 martial arts film directed by Ronny Yu and starring Jet Li. It is loosely based on the life of Huo Yuanjia, a Chinese martial artist who challenged foreign fighters in highly publicized events, restoring pride and nationalism to China at a time when Western imperialism and Japanese manipulation were eroding the country in the final years of the Qing Dynasty before the birth of the Republic of China. Li stated in an interview that the film was his last wushu martial arts epic, a point also made in the film's television promotions and other publicity.

Fearless was released on 26 January 2006 in Hong Kong, on 23 June 2006 in the United Kingdom, and on 22 September 2006 in the United States.

Plot

The film begins with Huo Yuanjia fighting and defeating three Westerners: a British boxer, a Belgian lancer, and a Spanish fencer. While waiting for the fourth match to begin, Huo remembers his father Huo Endi teaching martial arts. The story is then told in an extended flashback. Watching his father fight, the young Yuanjia wants to participate, but his father is concerned about his asthma. Yuanjia sees his father in a match with Zhao, who dishonorably won by retaliating when Huo Endi held back a fatal blow. Humiliated by his father's defeat, Huo Yuanjia vows to regain the Huo family's honor and pride. He practices martial arts behind his father's back. As time goes by, Huo Yuanjia defeats several opponents (including Zhao's son who bullied him when he was younger) and becomes a famous martial artist in Tianjin. As he becomes successful, he becomes more short-tempered and reckless and grows more arrogant and ruthless towards his opponents, unlike his late father who advocated showing mercy to opponents. This also leads to Huo gaining many followers and getting himself into financial trouble by spending his family's money on drinking and partying.

When a rival martial arts master named Qin Lei injures one of his followers, Huo feels insulted and furiously confronts Qin on his birthday, at a restaurant owned by Huo's childhood friend, Nong Jinsun. Failing to dissuade his friend from fighting and fed up with his ruthless behavior, Jinsun furiously and adamantly ends his friendship with Huo. The confrontation escalates into a fight that ends with Qin's death. Qin's godson seeks vengeance and kills Huo's mother and daughter. Huo goes to Qin's house, where Qin's godson admits to the murders before killing himself. Huo becomes depressed when he learns that it was his follower who had insulted Qin's mistress, which caused Qin to beat him.

Wracked with guilt, Huo flees Tianjin and wanders aimlessly for months. He nearly drowns in a river but is saved by Granny Sun and her blind granddaughter, Yueci. They bring him back to their village. Guided by their kindness, and over the years, Huo learns the value of compassion and mercy.

In 1907, Huo returns to Tianjin and sees the changes that have taken place. He apologizes to Qin's family and reconciles with Jinsun, now a businessman. He challenges the American wrestler, Hercules O'Brien. Prior to the match, Huo requests that he and Hercules fight with honor and civility. Taking advantage of the language barrier, the Announcer deliberately mistranslates Huo's request to "He wants to kick your butt". During their match, Huo saves O'Brien from being impaled on some nails and wins his gratitude. The match ends with O'Brien happily naming Huo the victor. Huo's fame spreads with successive bouts against other foreign fighters. In 1909, with funding from Jinsun, he founds Chin Woo Athletic Association in Shanghai.

The members of the foreign chamber of commerce fear that Huo's victories might fan anti-foreign sentiments among the Chinese people, thus becoming a disadvantage to them. They propose a match between Huo and four foreign champions. Huo takes up the challenge, even though he will have to fight four bouts in a row. Before the matches, Huo meets the Japanese champion Tanaka for tea and strikes up a friendship, with the men developing a mutual respect for one another.

The film then returns to the competition shown in the opening scenes. On September 14, 1910, Huo faces Tanaka after defeating the European challengers. In the first round, they fight with their weapons of choice. Huo uses a sanjiegun while Tanaka uses a katana. In the heat of the fight, they accidentally exchange weapons. Huo is able to handle the katana proficiently, while Tanaka can defend himself but fumbles when attacking with the sanjiegun. Huo offers to exchange weapons with Tanaka, and the first round ends in a draw. Before the next round, Huo unknowingly drinks tea poisoned by the members of the foreign chamber of commerce. In the second round involving unarmed combat, Huo has difficulty breathing and begins to lose his strength. He collapses and starts coughing blood as a result of arsenic poisoning. Tanaka and Huo's supporters demand that the match be halted and postponed, but Huo wishes to continue as he is going to die anyway. Huo, overwhelmed by Tanaka, still manages to deliver a final blow to Tanaka's chest, using the same technique that killed Qin, but deliberately holds back, smiling just before he collapses. Tanaka, aware that he could have died had Huo used more force, declares Huo the victor as Huo dies and respectfully bows to him as he collapses into the arms of his friend and students. Before departing, Tanaka angrily retorts to a protesting Japanese diplomat (who had Huo poisoned) that he was a disgrace to Japan for valuing his own personal gain by betting on and attempting to fix the match by poisoning Huo over having enough national pride in Tanaka that he could win honorably for Japan. Tanaka storms off to the diplomat's immense shock.

In the epilogue, Huo's spirit practices Wushu on a field while Yueci observes him. Huo turns to her and smiles, indicating a lover's reconciliation.

Cast

 Jet Li as Huo Yuanjia. Lu Yuhao played the younger Huo Yuanjia.
 Dong Yong as Nong Jinsun, a businessman and childhood friend of Huo Yuanjia. Zhu Qilong played the younger Nong Jinsun.
 Nakamura Shidō II as Anno Tanaka, a Japanese champion and an honourable man who respects Huo Yuanjia and upholds the spirit of Wushu.
 Collin Chou as Huo Endi, Huo Yuanjia's father.
 Betty Sun as Yueci, a village girl who took care of Huo Yuanjia when he was in a state of depression. She is called Moon in the US release.
 Nathan Jones as Hercules O'Brien, the American wrestler.
 Paw Hee-ching as Huo Yuanjia's mother
 Mike Leeder as Randall, the match referee.
 Ian Powers as Dante, the bellboy.
 Anthony De Longis as Anthony Garcia, the Spanish fencer.
 Brandon Rhea as Colonel Han Herzon, the Belgian lancer.
 Jean-Claude Leuyer as Peter Smith, the British boxer.
 Somluck Kamsing as Beicha, the Muay Thai kickboxer. He appears only in the director's cut.
 Masato Harada as Mr. Mita, the Japanese diplomat, who was despicable and dishonourable unlike Tanaka. He was the one who poisoned Huo Yuanjia, leading to his death
 John T. Benn as the American businessman
 Philippe Millieret as the French businessman
 John Paisley as the British businessman
 Michelle Yeoh as Ms. Yang, the narrator of Huo Yuanjia's story in the opening scene. She appears only in the director's cut.
 Hu Xiaoling as Huo Yuanjia's daughter. She is known as Jade in the US release.
 Chen Zhihui as Qin Lei, a rival martial arts master who was killed by Huo Yuanjia. He is known as Master Chin in the US release.
 He Sirong as Qin's wife
 Ma Yin as Qin's daughter
 Ting Leung as Laifu, the Huo family servant.
 Qu Yun as Granny Sun, Yueci's grandmother. She is known as Grandma in the US release.
 Ma Zhongxuan as Zhao Jian, Huo Yuanjia's childhood rival. Shang Yapeng played the younger Zhao Jian.
 Jacky Heung as Qin's godson, who kills Huo Yuanjia's family to avenge his godfather.
 Zhao Zhonggang as Zhao Zhiqiang, Zhao Jian's father who defeated Huo Endi in a match at the start of the film.
 Zheng Shiming as Xia Xiang
 Chen Fusheng as Xu Dashan
 Wang Qi as Gui
 He Jun as Bang, the town idiot
 Liu Licheng as Qiang
 Qian Yi as the referee at Huo and O'Brien's match
 Sun Yueqiu as accountant
 Yi Shixiong as Liu Zhensheng, Huo Yuanjia's student.
 Ma Jing, Wei Binghua, Zhao Tieying, Xu Yonghai and Song Shuo as Huo Yuanjia's students

Production

Alternate versions
The film was originally approximately 140 minutes long, but to fit market demand, it was cut to 105 minutes, and scenes by Michelle Yeoh and a fight between Jet Li and a Thai boxer, portrayed by Somluck Kamsing, were removed. A special release of the film in Thailand in March 2006 reinserted the scenes with Somluck (but not Michelle Yeoh), making its new running time approximately 110 minutes. In January 2007, Ronny Yu's original 140-minute director's cut was given an official DVD release in Hong Kong, featuring the full Michelle Yeoh subplot as well as the fight with Somluck Kamsing.

Within the Somluck Kamsing scene, there are two different endings. In the director's cut, the fight ends after Huo Yuanjia stops the Thai boxer from falling head first. In an alternate scene, the Thai boxer continues to fight after this and Huo appears to kill him with the exterminating blow, only to see that he had resisted, in which the boxer realises this and ends the fight.

Director's cut
Universal released the full 140-minute director's cut on DVD in North America in July 2008. The released DVD, however, contained 2 discs and has been reported to errantly contain both the existing US theatrical version and the existing unrated version and not the actual director's cut on either of the discs. However, many people were able to get replacement copies that had the director's cut after sending a complaint on their website.

In December 2008, Universal released the Blu-ray version of the film, which contains the three versions (Theatrical, Unrated, and Director's Cut) in a single disc.

There are many differences between the theatrical and director's cut.
 Instead of the film opening with the fighting competition in Shanghai, 1910, the film opens with Ms. Yang (Michelle Yeoh) explaining to the International Olympic Committee why wushu should be an Olympic sport. She then proceeds to tell the story of Huo Yuanjia, the man who helped wushu become a major sport.
 Before we see Huo as a child, a scene of him is shown seeking passage on a boat, with the boatman taking a small jade jewel out of a sack as payment from Huo (shown later to be the gift that Huo's daughter intended to give him when he wins his fight). This will also later be shown to be a scene of Huo wandering in despair.
 Before Huo and his friend, Nong Jinsun, as children, go to see Huo's father fight, there is a scene of Huo showing Nong his father's certificates from winning fights.
 There are scenes of Nong, as a child, copying the Huo family's wushu manual for Huo Yuanjia so he can learn.
 A scene was added of Huo Yuanjia, as a child, getting his revenge and defeating the son of master Zhao.
 After Huo's minor confrontation in the streets with Qin Lei, a scene is added of Huo beating his disciples for not working hard enough.
 An extra scene of Huo's family, waiting for him to come home after his competition.
 The montage of Huo wandering in despair is longer, as well as his time with the villagers.
 A scene was added of a young boy from the village, Gui, getting beaten by members of another neighbouring village for stealing an ox after his own died. The villagers of Huo's village protest to let him go, and when the man of the other village refuses, Huo offers to take Gui's punishment instead. He has to let a Thai boxer beat him until an incense stick burns out. Huo allows the Thai boxer to beat him until members of his village protest. Huo defends himself from the Thai boxer, but does not fight back. When the Thai boxer is about to hit his head on the ground, Huo saves him, and the Thai boxer bows in respect, and agrees to let Gui and the other villagers go.
 In his time with the villagers, Huo has a talk with two village boys about wushu, and makes them explain why they want to learn it.
 When Huo returns home, the black-and-white footage of battle shown at the beginning of the theatrical version is now shown right before Huo's return to Tianjin, with subtitles explaining that after the Qing Dynasty, foreign armies invaded China, and made Tianjin a semi-colony. Also added was a scene of Huo giving master Zhao, whom he defeated earlier in the beginning of the film, his copy of the Huo family's wushu manual. He later comes to Jingwu school and joins.
 After the main credits, Ms. Yang is walking away from the meeting, with a reporter asking her if she thinks she will succeed. She responds saying that she had done her best, and that is what is important. When the reporter asks, "Is it enough?", she smiles and walks away.
 Various scenes in the film are now given their time and place in subtitles. Also subtitled are the names of the three fighters Huo fights with before Tanaka in Shanghai, as well as their fighting styles.

Other names
 Some promotions, including television and AMC Theatres, billed the film as Jet Li's Fearless.
 The film is also known as Spirit in Japan.
 The film is also known by its Chinese title Huo Yuanjia.

Reception
The film holds a rating of 73% on Rotten Tomatoes with the consensus being, "Fearless is a brilliantly choreographed, beautifully filmed endcap to Li's quarter-decade of epic martial arts glory." Empire gave two stars out of five with a verdict stating, "Despite impressive, CG-light action sequences and an absorbing story which certainly stands another re-telling, director Ronny Yu barely elevates this above the level of a direct-to-video fightfest. Hero or Crouching Tiger it ain't."

Fearless opened in Hong Kong on 26 January 2006 during the Chinese New Year holidays. The film played to blockbuster business, eventually grossed an exceptional HK$30,201,600 by the end of its run on 8 March 2006, making it the highest-grossing domestic film of the territory of 2006.

On 22 September 2006, Fearless was released in 1,806 North American cinemas under the title Jet Li's Fearless. In its opening weekend, it placed 2nd at the box office to the sequel to Jackass, grossing US$10,590,244 (US$5,863 per screen). It was Jet Li's seventh film in a row to open to over US$10 million. The film went on to gross US$24,633,730 by the end of its North American run—making it the sixth highest-grossing non-English language foreign film in the United States to date—and its total worldwide gross US$68,072,848.

Controversy
The descendants of Huo Yuanjia were so upset by how their ancestor was portrayed in Fearless, as well as by the historical inaccuracies in the film, that they launched a lawsuit against Jet Li and the film's producers and distributors in March 2006. Huo Shoujin, an 81-year-old grandson of Huo Yuanjia, stated he was unhappy that the movie showed Huo Yuanjia causing "trouble", which led to the deaths of his mother and daughter. Huo Shoujin also denounced the filmmakers for depicting his grandfather as a violent fighter. In December 2006, a court in Beijing dismissed the case, saying Fearless was an exaggerated and fictitious portrait of Huo Yuanjia but it "contained no defamatory or libelous depictions".

Soundtrack
The film's soundtrack was composed by Shigeru Umebayashi.

The Taiwanese singer Jay Chou wrote and sang the theme song, also named "Huo Yuanjia". In the song, Chou sings in a falsetto voice for a few segments.

Awards and nominations

See also
 Jet Li filmography

References

External links
 US 
 
 
 
 
 HKMDB

2006 films
2006 martial arts films
Chinese epic films
Chinese martial arts films
Hong Kong biographical films
Hong Kong martial arts films
2000s Mandarin-language films
2000s Japanese-language films
Chinese biographical films
Films set in Shanghai
Films set in Tianjin
Films set in 19th-century Qing dynasty
Films set in 20th-century Qing dynasty
Films set in 1900
Films set in 1909
Films set in 1910
Kung fu films
Wushu films
Chinese New Year films
Focus Features films
Rogue (company) films
Films directed by Ronny Yu
Films scored by Shigeru Umebayashi
Martial arts tournament films
2000s English-language films
2000s Hong Kong films